Staropetrovo is a rural locality (a selo) in Staropetrovsky Selsoviet, Birsky District, Bashkortostan, Russia. The population was 216 as of 2010. There are 5 streets.

Geography 
Staropetrovo is located 21 km south of Birsk (the district's administrative centre) by road. Pityakovo is the nearest rural locality.

References 

Rural localities in Birsky District